Arts United Center is an arts center in Fort Wayne, Indiana, USA. 

The Fine Arts Foundation of Fort Wayne originally proposed the construction of a large complex devoted to the arts in the early 1960s. The foundation compiled an ambitious program including facilities to support an art school, gallery, theatre, orchestra, historical museum. In 1961, a selection committee commissioned architect Louis Kahn to design the project based on referral from Philip Johnson.

Kahn's first plan, presented in 1965, incurred an estimated cost of $20 million, which far exceeded the $2.5 million allocated for the project. In response to financial limitations, the project's scale was limited to the performing arts facilities; The Theatre of Performing Arts is the only realized building in Kahn's design.  Arts United (formerly Fine Arts Foundation) now cares for Arts Campus Fort Wayne, owning and operating the Arts United Center, Hall Community Arts Center, Auer Center for Arts and Culture, and Parkview Physicians Group ArtsLab. The cultural district also includes History Center, Fort Wayne Museum of Art, and Rankin House.

Arts United of Greater Fort Wayne is embarking on a strategic plan to bring the theatre up in renovation. The organization received $2 million from AWS Foundation on 2019 for accessibility.

References

External links

Louis Kahn buildings
Buildings and structures in Fort Wayne, Indiana
Arts centers in Indiana